Botterill is an English surname. Notable people with this surname include:
 Cal Botterill (born 1947), Canadian sports psychologist
 George Botterill (born 1949), English chess player and writer
 Jason Botterill (born 1976), American ice hockey manager and former player
 Jennifer Botterill (born 1979), Canadian hockey player
 Joseph Botterill (1862–1920) pastoralist and South Australian politician
 Michael Botterill (born 1980), Canadian footballer
 Nick Botterill (born 1962), British businessman
 William Botterill, (1820–1903), architect
 Doreen McCannell-Botterill (born 1947), Canadian winter sports athlete

See also
 Bottrill

English-language surnames